Ashlie Martini is a tribologist and professor of mechanical engineering at University of California, Merced.

Biography

Education
Martini received her Bachelor of Science in mechanical engineering in 1998 from Northwestern University, in Evanston, Illinois. She later completed her Doctor of Philosophy in the same field, at the same school, in 2007.

Career
She was an assistant professor at Purdue University in West Lafayette, Indiana before becoming a full professor at University of California, Merced.

Research
The topics of study at "Martini Research Group: Fundamental Tribology Lab" at UC Merced include:
Solid and liquid lubricants
Tribochemistry
Nanoscale contact and sliding

Martini's lab helps test dry lubricants for the Mars rover. "The Martini research group is performing some very critical and important data gathering for us and presenting that data in a way that helps us make critical, mission-sensitive decisions for Mars," said Duval Johnson of NASA's Jet Propulsion Laboratory.

Awards and honors
American Society of Mechanical Engineers - ASME Burt L. Newkirk Award (2012)
Air Force Office of Scientific Research - AFOSR Young Investigator Award

Distinctions
 Tribology Letters - Editor
 Tribology Transactions - Associate Editor 
 Tribology International - Editorial Board Member 
 Computational Materials Science - Editorial Board Member 
 Lubricants - Editorial Board Member 
Gordon Research Conference on Tribology (International Conference) - Chair
Society of Tribologists and Lubrication Engineers Tribology Frontiers Conference (International Conference) - Chair

Publications
Martini has over 250 publications. Her most cited work has been cited over 4400 times:

Cellulose nanomaterials review: structure, properties and nanocomposites
Robert J Moon, Ashlie Martini, John Nairn, John Simonsen, Jeff Youngblood, Chemical Society Reviews (2011)

Her second most cited work has been cited over 400 times:

Processing bulk natural wood into a high-performance structural material
Jianwei Song, Chaoji Chen, Shuze Zhu, Mingwei Zhu, Jiaqi Dai, Upamanyu Ray, Yiju Li, Yudi Kuang, Yongfeng Li, Nelson Quispe, Yonggang Yao, Amy Gong, Ulrich H Leiste, Hugh A Bruck, JY Zhu, Azhar Vellore, Heng Li, Marilyn L Minus, Zheng Jia, Ashlie Martini, Teng Li, Liangbing Hu, Nature (journal)

See also

Tribology
Mechanical engineering
ASME Burt L. Newkirk Award
Stick-slip phenomenon

References

External links

University of California, Merced faculty
Northwestern University alumni
American women scientists
American women engineers
Mechanical engineers
Tribologists
Living people
Year of birth missing (living people)
American women academics
21st-century American women